Bert Haldane (1871–1937) was a British film director of the silent era.

Filmography 
Filmography - based on IMDb  - is complete.

1910

Coals of Fire (1910)
Tried and Found True (1910)
Cast Thy Bread Upon the Waters (1910)
Behind the Scenes (1910)
A Village Love Story (1910)
The Thieves' Decoy (1910)
The Queen of the May (1910)
The Miser's Lesson (1910)
Her Debt of Honour (1910)
Hunger's Curse (1910)
Dora (1910)
Circumstantial Evidence (1910)
All Is Not Gold That Glitters (1910)
Woman vs. Woman (1910)
The Farmer's Two Sons (1910)
A Plucky Kiddie (1910)
A Chum's Treachery (1910)

1911

Right Is Might (1911)
A Girl's Love Letter (1911)
A Fool and His Money (1911)
The Faith Healer (1911)
The Road to Ruin (1911)
The Man Who Kept Silent (1911)
Lottery Ticket No. 66 (1911)
The Silver Lining (1911)
A Touch of Nature (1911)
A Struggling Author (1911)
A Nephew's Artifice (1911)
The Convict's Sister (1911)
The Baby and the Bomb (1911)
Kiddie (1911)
Hilda's Lovers (1911)
For Better or Worse (1911)
Elsie, the Gamekeeper's Daughter (1911)
The Trail of Sand (1911)
The Torn Letter (1911)
Proud Clarissa (1911)
Jack's Sister (1911)
An' Good in the Worst of Us (1911)
Wealthy Brother John (1911)
His Son (1911)
A Burglar for a Night (1911)
The Impediment (1911)
A Bid for Fortune (1911)
The Reclamation of Snarky (1911)
The Broad Arrow (1911)

1912

The Girl at the Lodge 
Bill's Temptation 
A Night of Peril 
The Child Detective 
Phoebe of the Inn 
Our Bessie 
A Girl Alone 
The Blind Heroine 
His Actress Daughter
Bill's Reformation 
The Deception
When Gold Is Dross
The Birthday That Mattered
A Dumb Matchmaker
Was He Justified?
The Disinherited Nephew
Ethel's Danger
The Poacher's Fight for Liberty
The Little Poacher
The Irony of Fate
Pippin Up to His Pranks
Peter Pickles' Wedding
Only an Outcast
Her Better Self
The Trail of the Fatal Ruby
The Reward of Perseverance
The Poacher's Reform
The Eccentric Uncle's Will
His Honour at Stake
Won by a Snapshot
Neighbours
Muriel's Double
A Fight for Life
A Brother's Sacrifice
The Stab of Disgrace
The Fighting Parson
The Draughtsman's Revenge
Robert's Lost Supper
Jeff's Downfall
How Vandyck Won His Wife
How Molly and Polly Got Pa's Consent
For Baby's Sake
The Lieutenant's Bride (1912)
Her Sacrifice

1913

Was He a Coward?
The Turning Point
The Interrupted Honeymoon
That Awful Pipe
Mary of Briarwood Dell
Suspicious Mrs. Brown
Peter Tries Suicide
The Price of Deception
Alfred Harding's Wooing
Allan Field's Warning
A Village Scandal
The Debt of Gambling
Zaza the Dancer
When Paths Diverge
Polly the Girl Scout and the Jewel Thieves
Polly the Girl Scout's Timely Aid
Peter Pens Poetry
Luggage in Advance
A Lucky Escape for Dad
Just Like a Mother
Polly the Girl Scout and Grandpa's Medals
The Test
A Double Life
Binks' Wife's Uncle
Uncle as Cupid
Never Forget the Ring
East Lynne
Now She Lets Him Go Out
Little Elsie
Molly's Burglar
In the Shadow of Darkness
 Fisherman's Luck
Humanity; or, Only a Jew
Younita
Sixty Years a Queen

1914

A Brother's Atonement
The Lure of London
The Last Encampment
By His Father's Orders
Lights of London
Jim the Fireman
The Last Round
As a Man Sows; or, An Angel of the Slums
Your Country Needs You
The German Spy Peril
Their Only Son
His Sister's Honour

1915

Tommy Atkins
Beneath the Mask
Jane Shore
Darkest London: or, The Dancer's Romance
The Rogues of London
Five Nights
Do Unto Others
By the Shortest of Heads
Brigadier Gerard
Poor Clem
Cowboy Clem
The Knut and the Kernel
The Barnstormers
Jack Tar

1916

The Lady Slavey
Some Detectives
Truth and Justice

1917

Men Were Deceivers Ever
A Boy Scout's Dream; or, How Billie Captured the Kaiser
A Birmingham Girl's Last Hope
The Child and the Fiddler

1918/1919

The Ticket-of-Leave Man
The Romance of Lady Hamilton

1920

The Grip of Iron
Mary Latimer, Nun
The Woman and Officer 26
The Winding Road

1922

The Affected Detective
Gipsy Blood
Eliza's Romeo
Auntie's Wedding Present

References

External links

1871 births
1937 deaths
People from Warrington
English film directors